The O'Neill's pub in Muswell Hill Broadway is a Grade II listed building with Historic England. It is a former church. It closed in July 2017 for conversion to a Miller & Carter  restaurant.

References

External links 

Former churches in London
Grade II listed pubs in London
Pubs in the London Borough of Haringey
Muswell Hill
Former pubs in London